(formerly known as ) is a Japanese association football club that plays in the J1 League, following promotion from the J2 League in 2017. Based in Nagoya, Aichi Prefecture and founded as the company team of the Toyota Motor Corp. in 1939, the club shares its home games between Mizuho Athletic Stadium (capacity 27,000 and the J.League's oldest serving stadium) and the much larger Toyota Stadium in the suburb of Toyota (capacity 45,000).

The team had its most successful season up to 1995 when it was managed by Arsène Wenger, well known for his subsequent exploits at Arsenal. They won the Emperor's Cup and finished second in the J.League, with Dragan Stojković and Gary Lineker on the team. The 1995 success was eclipsed on November 20, 2010, when the club won its first J.League trophy, under the management of Stojković.

The team's name was derived from the two most prominent symbols of Nagoya: the two golden grampus dolphins on the top of Nagoya Castle, and the Maru-Hachi (Circle eight), the city's official symbol.

History

JSL era
Toyota Motor SC was overshadowed by its colleague Toyota Automated Loom Works SC (founded in 1946 and which was one of the founding members of the Japan Soccer League). When Toyota ALW were relegated to regional leagues in 1968, Toyota Motor saw an opportunity to rise at their expense.

In 1972 the club was founding members of the JSL's Second Division and its inaugural champions. They remained in the JSL until the J.League's founding in 1993. They were relegated to the JSL Division 2 in 1977. After a brief return in 1987–88, they were promoted for good in 1989–90 and remained in the top flight for 26 years, until 2016.

J.League era

Nagoya Grampus Eight was an original member ("Original Ten") of the J.League in 1993. In 1996, future Arsenal manager Arsène Wenger led Grampus to the 1996 Emperor's Cup and a runners-up finish in the J.League, the club's best finish. The team's name "Nagoya Grampus Eight" was changed to just "Nagoya Grampus" at the start of the 2008 season. In 2008, Nagoya appointed former player Dragan Stojković as manager. They finished in third place and qualified for the AFC Champions League for the first time. Stojković has since led the club to winning the J.League in the 2010 season, featuring a squad consisting of Marcus Tulio Tanaka, Mu Kanazaki, Seigo Narazaki, Yoshizumi Ogawa, Keiji Tamada and Joshua Kennedy.
After a poor 2016 season, Nagoya Grampus were relegated to J2 League for the first time in their history. Boško Gjurovski left his post as manager. On 4 January 2017, Yahiro Kazama was appointed as the club's new manager. On 3 December 2017, Nagoya Grampus drew 0-0 against Avispa Fukuoka in the promotion playoff final, securing promotion back to J1 League at the first time of asking due to their higher regular season position than Avispa Fukuoka.

Kashima Soccer Stadium curse
Since Nagoya were dealt a 5–0 defeat by the Kashima Antlers at the Kashima Soccer Stadium on 16 May in the 1993 J.League season opener, Nagoya suffered a losing streak of 22 consecutive games to the Kashima Antlers at the Kashima Soccer Stadium which included Emperor's Cup and J.League Cup games. Nagoya finally got their first victory over the Kashima Antlers at the Kashima Soccer Stadium on 23 August of the 2008 J.League season, some 15 years later.

Record as J.League member

Key

Honours
Toyota Motor SC (1939-1991)/Nagoya Grampus (1991-Present)

League 
J.League Division 1
Champions (1): 2010
Japan Soccer League Division 2
Champions (1): 1972

Cups 
Emperor's Cup:
Winners (2): 1995, 1999
J.League Cup:
Winners (1): 2021
Japanese Super Cup:
Winners (2): 1996, 2011
All Japan Senior Football Championship
Winners (2): 1968, 1970
Konica Cup
Winners (1): 1991

Current squad

Out on loan

Reserve squad (U-18s)

Colour, sponsors and manufacturers

Kit evolution

Club staff
For the 2023 season.

Managers
Information correct as of match played 4 December 2021. Only competitive matches are counted.

Notes:

‡ As caretaker manager

Personnel awards

J.League Player of the Year
 Dragan Stojković (1995)
 Seigo Narazaki (2010)

J.League Top Scorer
 Ueslei (2003)
 Joshua Kennedy (2010, 2011)
 Jô (2018)

J.League Best Eleven
 Dragan Stojković (1995, 1996, 1999)
 Ueslei (2003)
 Seigo Narazaki (2003, 2008, 2010, 2011)
 Marques (2004)
 Yoshizumi Ogawa (2008)
 Joshua Kennedy (2010, 2011)
 Danilson Córdoba (2010)
 Marcus Tulio Tanaka (2010, 2011, 2012)
 Takahiro Masukawa (2010)
 Jungo Fujimoto (2011)
 Jô (2018)

J.League Rookie of the Year
 Yoshizumi Ogawa (2008)

J.League Manager of the Year
 Arsène Wenger (1995)
 Dragan Stojković (2010)

World Cup players
The following players have been selected by their country in the World Cup, while playing for Nagoya Grampus:
 Takashi Hirano (1998)
 Dragan Stojković (1998)
 Seigo Narazaki (2002, 2006, 2010)
 Keiji Tamada (2006, 2010)
 Joshua Kennedy (2010)
 Marcus Tulio Tanaka (2010)

League history
Regional League (Tokai Adult Soccer League): 1966–71
Division 2 (JSL Div. 2): 1972
Division 1 (JSL Div. 1): 1973–77
Division 2 (JSL Div. 2): 1978–86
Division 1 (JSL Div. 1): 1987
Division 2 (JSL Div. 2): 1988–89
Division 1 (JSL Div. 1): 1990–91
Division 1 (J.League Div. 1): 1992–2016
Division 2 (J2 League): 2017
Division 1 (J.League Div. 1): 2018
(As of 2015): 33 seasons in the top tier, 12 seasons in the second tier and 6 seasons in the Regional Leagues.

In popular culture
In the Captain Tsubasa manga series, one character was player of Nagoya Grampus and is the goalkeeper Ken Wakashimazu which was player of Yokohama Flügels before the closing of the Yokohama team. In 2013, the midfielder Shingo Aoi wear the Nagoya Grampus jersey in a Yoichi Takahashi tribute to the 20 years of J.League.

See also
 Grampus-kun (The team mascot)

Notes

References

External links
  
 Fans Account on Twitter 

 
Association football clubs established in 1991
1939 establishments in Japan
J.League clubs
Japan Soccer League clubs
Football clubs in Japan
Sports teams in Nagoya
Emperor's Cup winners
Japanese League Cup winners